= Dai Llwyd =

Dai Llwyd was a 15th-century Welsh harpist, and warrior. He is known to have composed the air, ‘Ffarwel Dai Llwyd’ as he departed to join the army marching to Bosworth Field.
